is a railway station located in the town of Ajigasawa, Aomori Prefecture Japan, operated by the East Japan Railway Company (JR East).

Lines

Station layout
Narusawa Station has one ground-level side platform serving a single bi-directional track. The station is unattended.

History
Narusawa Station was opened on May 15, 1925 as a station on the Japan National Railways (JNR). With the privatization of the JNR on April 1, 1987, it came under the operational control of JR East. A new station building was completed in August 2012.

Surrounding area
Narusawa Post Office

See also
 List of Railway Stations in Japan

References

External links

  

Stations of East Japan Railway Company
Railway stations in Aomori Prefecture
Gonō Line
Ajigasawa, Aomori
Railway stations in Japan opened in 1925